Kalâm-e Saranjâm or simply Saranjâm is the central religious book in Yarsanism written in Gorani and Kurdish and contains old texts from the time of Sultan Sahak. Besides this book, other books can be considered part of the Saranjâm since they also contain texts from the same period. The texts could have been written by saints who were reincarnations of each other or had spiritual access to the period and therefore could contextualize what was said with what happened.

Content 
An authentic copy of Kalâm-e Saranjâm exists, written by Shâh Hayâsi Ahl-e Haqq in calligraphy. This text has 180 pages and contains chapters on Saâh Khoshin, Bâbâ Nâ’us, Sultan Shakar, the story of Pire wa Pirali, of Yâdegâr and Shâh Ebrâhimi, of the Haftawâna, The Twelve Imams, the Cheltan, the Qawaltâs, the recommendations of Soltân for the performance of the jem. The rest of the book contains poems. The text was translated to Russian by Vladimir Minorsky but is not available.

A hymn on sacrifice 
The following is an extract from a hymn from Saranjâm:

Notes

Bibliography

External links 
The Yaresan : a sociological, historical and religio-historical study of a Kurdish community / M. Reza Hamzeh'ee. Berlin : Schwarz, 1990

15th-century books
Yarsan texts
Kurdish literature
Religious texts
Kurdish words and phrases
Kurdish books